Stephen Kelly may refer to:

Stephen Kelly (footballer, born 1983), Irish footballer
Stephen Kelly (Scottish footballer)  (born 2000), Scottish footballer for Rangers, Ross County, Salford,  Livingston
Stephen Kelly (Wicklow Gaelic footballer) (born 1987), Gaelic footballer for Wicklow
Stephen Kelly (Limerick Gaelic footballer), Gaelic footballer for Limerick
Stephen Kelly (canoeist) (born 1944), American sprint canoer
Stephen F. Kelly (born 1946), English author and broadcaster
Stephen Kelly (businessman) (born 1961), English software executive
Stephen A. Kelly (1833–1910), Irish-American Catholic priest and Jesuit

See also
Steve Kelley (disambiguation)
Steve Kelly (disambiguation)
Steven Kelly (born 1955), Bahamian businessman who competed as a sailor in three Olympic Games